

 was a medical doctor, microbiologist and a lieutenant general in the Imperial Japanese Army.

He was the second commander of Unit 731, a covert biological and chemical warfare research and development unit responsible for some of the most notorious war crimes carried out by Japanese personnel.

Biography 
Masaji Kitano was born on 14 July 1894 in Hyōgo Prefecture, Japan.

He graduated in medicine from the School of Medicine, Tokyo Imperial University on 26 November 1920 and the following year was commissioned as a lieutenant as an army surgeon. In 1923 at Tokyo Imperial University's graduate school, he commenced studies in infectious diseases, intestinal perforation and shigella, and became first class army surgeon seven months later. He received his doctoral degree in 1925 with a dissertation titled "Experimental research on seronegative intestine perforation and parathyroid fever", four years before being promoted to third-class army surgeon.

In 1932, he worked in the First Army Hospital and taught at the Medical Department of the Ministry of War of Japan. The following year he visited the United States and Europe for research, and in August 1935 held the position of chief second-class army surgeon (Nitō guni sei). In 1936, he was dispatched to Manchukuo and became a professor at the Manchu School of Medicine, teaching microbiology.

In 1942, he was appointed the second commander of Unit 731. His predecessor was Shirō Ishii. In April 1945, he was promoted to lieutenant surgeon general and appointed commander of the 13th Army Medical Corps. After the Japanese surrender in August 1945, he was detained in a POW camp in Shanghai. Like all involved with Unit 731 or Japanese biological warfare, he was repatriated to Japan in January 1946.

Kitano was one of the founders of the Japanese pharmaceutical company and first commercial blood bank Green Cross, which was renamed Welfide in 1998 and which became part of Mitsubishi Pharma in 2001.

In 1959, he became head of the plant in Tokyo and the chief director of that company. He was the chief funeral commissioner of Shiro Ishii.

Kitano died in Tokyo in 1986.

References

Further reading 
Romanova, Viktoriya. Shulatov, Yaroslav A. (2018) The Echo of the Khabarovsk Trials: The USSR and the Allegation Cam paign against the USA of Using Biological Warfare during the Korean War (1950–1953). History of Medicine 5(4): 262–272. 

1894 births
1986 deaths
Japanese biological weapons program
Businesspeople in the pharmaceutical industry
University of Tokyo alumni
Japanese military personnel of World War II
Japanese human subject research
Japanese mass murderers
Japanese military doctors